Ctenolimnophila is a genus of crane flies in the family Limoniidae.

Species
Subgenus Abitagua Alexander, 1944
C. longifusa Alexander, 1944
Subgenus Campbellomyia Alexander, 1925
C. alpina (Alexander, 1922)
C. brevitarsis (Alexander, 1926)
C. harrisiana (Alexander, 1924)
C. madagascariensis Alexander, 1960
C. neolimnophiloides Alexander, 1942
C. paulistae Alexander, 1943
C. severa Alexander, 1943
C. venustipennis (Alexander, 1925)
Subgenus Ctenolimnophila Alexander, 1921
C. bivena Alexander, 1921
C. decisa (Alexander, 1914)
C. fuscoanalis Alexander, 1946

References

Limoniidae
Tipulomorpha genera